Phytometra rhodarialis, the pink-bordered yellow, is a moth of the family Erebidae. The species was first described by Francis Walker in 1859. It is found from southern Ontario in Canada and Missouri and New Hampshire in the United States, south to Florida and Texas in the United States, possibly only as stray northward.

The wingspan is about 20 mm. There are two or more generations in Ohio and New Jersey and more generations southward.

The larvae feed on Polygala species. Larvae have been reared on Polygala lutea and Polygala mariana. They fed on flowers and chewed away the parenchyma and other green surface tissues of the square stems but largely ignored leaves.

References

Boletobiinae
Moths of North America